Kodiak is an unincorporated community in Andrew County, in the U.S. state of Missouri.

History
A post office called Kodiak was established in 1892, and remained in operation until 1904. The community was named by postal officials.

References

Unincorporated communities in Andrew County, Missouri
Unincorporated communities in Missouri